Lubajny  is a village in the administrative district of Gmina Ostróda, within Ostróda County, Warmian-Masurian Voivodeship, in northern Poland. Its church is red and white.

References

Lubajny